The Serbia women's national rugby league team is organised by the Serbian Rugby League and represents Serbia in international rugby league.

Serbia first played full international Test Matches in 2019. Their inaugural match was against Italy in Italy in June 2019. Serbia then hosted a two Test Match tour by Canada in September 2019.

Serbia is a participant in the Women's Rugby League European Championship (B Division).

Current squad 
The following players where named in a squad to play in the 2022 Rugby League Women's European Championship B. Figures in the table include the first match (against Greece).

Results

Full internationals 

Upcoming Fixtures:
 France v Serbia on 18 March 2023 at Parc Des Sports, Avignon
 During 2023 and 2024 Serbia are drawn to play the following three teams in Group B of the European Qualifiers for the 2025 Women's Rugby League  World Cup. Dates and hosts have been selected but the venues are yet to be announced.
  on 28 Oct 2023 in Serbia.
  on 11 May 2024 in Malta.
  on 18 May 2024 in Italy.

Past Squads 
The following players were selected to represent Serbia in the three Test Matches of 2019.

See also 
 Rugby league in Serbia
 Serbia national rugby league team

Reference

Rugby league
Women's national rugby league teams
Rugby league in Serbia